Jackson Council may be:

 Jackson Council (Michigan)
 Jackson Council (Mississippi)